Yende is a surname. Notable people with the surname include:

 Mthokozisi Yende (born 1984), South African footballer
 Pretty Yende (born 1985), South African opera singer
 Sizwe Sama Yende (born 1977), South African journalist and author

See also
 Yendi